Prokino is a rural locality (a village) in Novlenskoye Rural Settlement, Vologodsky District, Vologda Oblast, Russia. The population was 11 as of 2002.

Geography 
The distance to Vologda is 70 km, to Novlenskoye is 10 km.

References 

Rural localities in Vologodsky District